Ekerot is a Swedish surname. Notable people with the surname include:

 Bengt Ekerot (1920–1971), Swedish actor and director
 David Ekerot (born 1970), Swedish tennis player
 Gunhild Margareta Hallin Ekerot (1931–2020), Swedish opera singer

Swedish-language surnames